Mary's Harbour is a town in the Canadian province of Newfoundland and Labrador. The town had a population of 312 in the Canada 2021 Census, down from 341 in the Canada 2016 Census. It is serviced by Mary's Harbour Airport.

Mary's Harbour surrounds the St. Mary's River, which was the site of a salmon fishery as early as the 1780s. However, Mary's Harbour was not a permanent settlement until after a fire at Battle Harbour in 1930. The International Grenfell Association decided to relocate its hospital and boarding school, destroyed by the fire, from Battle Harbour to Mary's Harbour. Mary's Harbour has always depended on the fishery for its livelihood. Since the Collapse of the Atlantic northwest cod fishery the community has thrived on the crab fishery. The Labrador Fishermen's Union Shrimp Company employs over 120 people at the local crab processing facility. It is also the gateway to the National Historic District of Battle Harbour.

Climate
Mary's Harbour has a subarctic climate (Koppen: Dfc) with cold winters in spite of its marine position, courtesy of the cold waters of the Labrador Current. As typical of eastern Canada, Mary's Harbour receives heavy snowfall each winter. Unusually for such a climate, it has a pronounced seasonal lag, especially in the summer, with September averaging warmer than June and October warmer than May. A more typical subarctic climate, like Oymyakon, Russia has a temperature lag of only about 15 days.

Demographics 

Notable residents

 Yvonne Jones, Member of Parliament for Labrador; former Leader of the Liberal Party of Newfoundland and Labrador

See also
 Battle Harbour
 List of cities and towns in Newfoundland and Labrador
 International Grenfell Association
 NunatuKavut
 Barren Bay

References

Towns in Newfoundland and Labrador
Populated places in Labrador